The National Commission on Correctional Health Care (NCCHC) is an independent, non-profit organization with the stated goal of improving the standard of care in the field of correctional health care in the United States. With support from the major national organizations representing the fields of health, law and corrections, the National Commission on Correctional Health Care is committed to improving the quality of health care in jails, prisons, and juvenile confinement facilities.

NCCHC's origins date to the early 1970s, when an American Medical Association study of jails found inadequate, disorganized health services and a lack of national standards. In collaboration with other organizations, the AMA established a program that in the early 1980s became the NCCHC, which is now supported by the major national organizations representing the fields of health, law, and corrections.

Accreditation and certification
NCCHC offers voluntary health services accreditation program to correctional facilities. The process uses external peer reviews to determine whether correctional institutions meet national standards in their provision of health services. NCCHC also offers certification programs to individual correctional health care workers in the form of Certified Correctional Health Professional (CCHP).

References

External links 

 

Medical and health organizations based in Illinois
Prison healthcare